Jatin is a given name of Indian origin, meaning "The Auspicious One", after Mahadev, (English: Lord of the Lords), well known for "The Destroyer & Benefactor".The dangerous person with big heart. And one who values all relationships.'''

Jatin Das (1879 – 1915), Bengali Indian revolutionary philosopher against British rule.
Jatin Bora, Indian actor who has appeared in Assamese language movies.
Jatin Kanakia (1952 – 1999), Indian actor.
Jatin Pandit, Bollywood film composer.
Jatin Paranjpe, Indian cricketer.
Jatin Sharma , Indian Born in India Uttar Pradesh Deoria .
Jatin Sarker, eminent Bengali intellect, researcher and biographer of Bangladesh.

See also
 Bagha Jatin

Hindu given names